James Ernest Goins (August 31, 1948 – June 7, 2015) was an American Lumbee politician who served as the Chairman of the Lumbee Tribe of North Carolina from 2004 to 2010. As Lumbee Tribal Chairman, Goins led efforts to gain federal recognition for the Lumbee tribe during the 2000s. The 55,000-member Lumbee have achieved North Carolina state recognition, but have not yet received federal recognition. The Lumbee are the largest tribe living east of the Mississippi River who have not received federal recognition.

Goins was born on August 31, 1948, to Ernest and Ola Lee Goins. He was raised in Prospect, North Carolina. In 1965, Goins was a member of the Prospect High School basketball team which won the Indian Basketball Championship. Goins later served as an infantry squad leader with the 504th Infantry Regiment of the 82nd Airborne Division during the Vietnam War.

Jimmy Goins served as the Chairman of the Lumbee Tribe for six years from 2004 until 2010. As Chairman, Goins led efforts to achieve federal recognition for the Lumbee during the 2000s. He testified before the United States Senate Committee on Indian Affairs in September 2007 in an effort to gain recognition. In 2010, Goins signed a controversial lobbying contract with a Nevada-based gaming consultant.

Goins ran for Chairman again in 2012, but lost the election his successor, incumbent Lumbee Chairman Paul Brooks, on November 12, 2012. Brooks received 2,559 votes, or 52% of the vote, while Goins placed second with 2,042 votes (42%). A third candidate, Lynn Bruce Jacobs, received 298 votes (6%).

A resident of Philadelphus, North Carolina, he and his wife, Diane Goins, had three daughters, Rhonda, Jackie and Jamie.

Jimmy Goins was killed in a car accident at 1:30 p.m. on June 7, 2015, at the age of 66. Goins was driving on North Carolina Highway 71, approximately 4.4 miles from the town of Maxton, North Carolina, when the accident occurred. North Carolina Governor Pat McCrory and North Carolina First Lady Ann McCrory released a joint statement of condolence following Goins' death. McCrory ordered that all state flags be lowered to half staff in Goins' memory on June 11, 2015.

References

1948 births
2015 deaths
21st-century Native Americans
United States Army personnel of the Vietnam War
Lumbee people
Military personnel from North Carolina
Native American leaders
Lumbee Tribe of North Carolina politicians
North Carolina politicians
People from Maxton, North Carolina
People from Robeson County, North Carolina
United States Army soldiers